Bertha Steedman (20 July 1866 – 11 January 1945) was a British tennis player who won nine double titles at the All England Championships, a precursor to the Wimbledon Championships, between 1889 and 1899.

Steedman won the All England Championships doubles tournament with her sister Mary Steedman in 1889 and 1890. From 1893 to 1897 she won the doubles title partnering Blanche Bingley, then in 1898 and 1899 with Ruth Durlacher.

Bertha and her sister Mary were among the first who focused on playing volley which was the basis of their success.

In singles, her last appearance at Wimbledon was in 1903.

References

British female tennis players
1866 births
1945 deaths
English female tennis players
Tennis people from Shropshire